Bursting Bubbles is a studio album by the British rock musician Kevin Coyne, with Dagmar Krause, which was released in 1980. Colin Larkin in the 2011 edition of his Encyclopedia of Popular Music, gives the album three stars.

The album was described by Penny Kiley of Melody Maker as follows:
"These are personal songs from people you'd rather not be. Sympathise at your peril. You can try to avoid the messages. The music is interesting and quite accessible. Often it's only the voice that hurts, while the music can be attractively rhythmic (anguish you can dance to) or even gentle. The music seems oblivious to the pain, yet it fits."

Coyne would later perform "Children's Crusade" as part of his concert, on 6 October 1982, at the Tempodrom, celebrating the fall of the Berlin Wall, the event captured in the German film The Last Wall directed by Diethard Küster.

Track listing
All tracks composed by Kevin Coyne and Brian Godding, except where indicated.
 "The Only One" (Coyne)
 "Children's Crusade" (Coyne)
 "No Melody" (Coyne)
 "Learn to Swim - Learn to Drown"
 "Mad Boy No. 2"
 "Dark Dance Hall"
 "Don't Know What to Do"
 "A Little Piece of Heaven"
 "Day to Day"
 "Golden Days" (Bob Ward)
 "Old Fashioned Love Song"

Personnel
 Kevin Coyne – acoustic guitar, vocals
 Dagmar Krause - vocals
 Brian Godding - guitar
 Bob Ward -  guitar
 Chris Hunter - saxophone
 Vic Sweeney – drums
Technical
 Producers: Kevin Coyne and Al James
 Engineers: Al James and Vic Sweeney
 Cover artwork: Kevin Coyne

References

1980 albums
Kevin Coyne albums
Virgin Records albums